James H. Cummiskey (January 4, 1850 – February 5, 1925) was a merchant and political figure on Prince Edward Island. He represented 3rd Queens in the Legislative Assembly of Prince Edward Island from 1891 to 1911 as a Liberal.

He was born in Fort Augustus, Prince Edward Island, the first son of Hubert (some texts say Hugh) Cummiskey and Ellen Mitchell. Cummiskey married Catherine Woods(b. 1856 - d. 1925)in St. Joachim Roman Catholic church, Vernon River, PEI in 1878 and they had 12 children. He operated a general store and also farmed. He was an unsuccessful candidate for a seat in the provincial assembly in 1890, but was then elected in an 1891 by-election held after Donald Ferguson ran for a federal seat. Cummiskey served as speaker for the assembly from 1898 to 1900. He was also a member of the province's Executive Council, serving as Minister of Public Works. Cummiskey died in Massachusetts at the age of 75.

References 
 

Speakers of the Legislative Assembly of Prince Edward Island
Prince Edward Island Liberal Party MLAs
1850 births
1925 deaths